The NS 93 (Neumático Santiago 1993) is the third generation of rubber tired rolling stock used on the Santiago Metro system. The trains were manufactured by GEC Alsthom in 1996 and went into operation in 1997. Originally designed for use on Line 5, the trains first operated on Line 2 prior to the opening of Line 5, and today work on the lines 1 and 5.

Features 
The NS 93 series is based on the design of MP 89 series from the Paris Métro, along with sloped ends, automatic doors and through gangways from car to car. However, the NS 93 is slightly taller than the MP 89 to accommodate air conditioning, and they operate in 6 car formations on Line 5 (SN-NP-NNS), 7 car formations on Lines 1 and 5 (SN-NP-NRNS), and 8 car formations on Line 1 (NNS-NRNS). As a result, the trains can operate in six-car , seven-car , and eight-car  lengths, depending which line they are assigned to.

The interior of the NS 93 is graced with a cream white scheme with orange plastic seating. Each trainset is also equipped with a train speed surveillance system (SACEM), which the MP 89 does not have. In 2010, automated station announcements were added to all trains.

Other Specifications 
Tread safety wheels: 
Drive System: Four three-phase asynchronous AC motors (1 motor per bogie)
Engine power: 
Acceleration: 
Year of manufacture: From 1996 (N2051) until 2003 (N2084)

Incidents 
On February 7, 2012, a train en route to one of the garages derailed near a condominium complex and playground. The train was not in service at the time and was only operating in testing mode following repair work. No injuries were reported, but the train and surrounding property, including four vehicles, suffered substantial damage.

References 
The information in this article is based on that in its Spanish equivalent.

 Metro de Santiago 

Alstom multiple units
Electric multiple units of Chile
Santiago Metro
Train-related introductions in 1997
750 V DC multiple units